The France national junior handball team is the national under–20 Handball team of France. Controlled by the French Handball Federation, it represents France in international matches.

Squad

2019 World Championship winner squad

Goalkeepers
Gauthier Ivah (PSG Handball)
Valentin Kieffer (Sélestat Alsace Handball)
Left Wingers
Antonin Mohamed  (US Ivry Handball)
Gaël Tribillon  (Fenix Toulouse Handball)
Dylan Nahi (PSG Handball)
Right Wingers
Edouard Kempf (PSG Handball)
Benjamin Richert (Chambéry SMB HB)
Line players
Robin Dourte (PSG Handball)
Jonathan Mapu (Saint-Raphaël Var Handball)
Tom Poyet (USAM Nîmes Gard)

Left Backs
Nori Benhalima  (Chambéry SMB HB)
Axel Cochery (US Ivry Handball)
Yoann Gibelin (US Créteil Handball)
Elohim Prandi  (USAM Nîmes Gard
Centre Backs
Noah Gaudin (Cesson Rennes MHB)
Kyllian Villeminot (Montpellier Handball)
Right Backs
Julien Bos (Montpellier Handball)
Clément Damiani (Chambéry SMB HB)

2015 World Championship winner squad

Goalkeepers
Julien Meyer (Sélestat Alsace Handball)
Julien Salmon (HBC Nantes)
Left Wingers
Mahamadou Keita (US Ivry Handball)
Queido Traoré (Chambéry SMB HB)
Right Wingers
Florian Billant (US Dunkerque Handball)
Youenn Cardinal (US Créteil Handball)
Line players
Johannes Marescot (Chambéry SMB HB)
Nicolas Nieto (US Dunkerque Handball)
Nicolas Tournat (HBC Nantes)

Left Backs
Quentin Dupuy (USAM Nîmes Gard)
Adama Sako (Tremblay Handball)
Rudy Seri (Sélestat Alsace Handball)
Centre Backs
Sébastien Joumel (US Dunkerque Handball)
Alexandre Saïdani (Montpellier Handball)
Right Backs
Florian Delecroix (HBC Nantes)
Alexandre Tritta (Chambéry SMB HB)

References

External links
World Men's Junior Championship table
European Men's Junior Championship table

Handball in France
Men's national junior handball teams
Handball